Blues Highway is a 1994 American short documentary film directed by Bill Guttentag and Vince DiPersio. It was nominated for an Academy Award for Best Documentary Short.

References

External links

1994 short films
1994 films
1994 documentary films
1994 independent films
American short documentary films
American independent films
Films directed by Bill Guttentag
1990s short documentary films
1990s English-language films
1990s American films